Clara is a German television series.

See also
List of German television series

External links
 

1993 German television series debuts
1993 German television series endings
ZDF original programming
German children's television series
Television series about horses
German-language television shows